Krapperup Castle is an estate at Höganäs Municipality in Scania, Sweden. The foundation Gyllenstiernska Krapperupstiftelsen has been the owner of Krapperup with its land areas and other properties since 1967.

History
In the middle of the 16th century, the large rectangular brick main house was built in Renaissance style. In 1667, the Danish noble family Rantzau  sold Krapperup to Swedish Countess Maria Sofia De la Gardie (1627–1694). During her time the manor house was rebuilt in Baroque style. Petter Gotthard von Kochen had Krapperup restored in Rococo during the period 1750–60.
In the 19th century, the surrounding area was transformed into an English style garden by owners Nils and Ellen Gyllenstierna. Their son diplomat Eric Gyllenstierna af Lundholm (1882–1940) inherited the estate.

See also
List of castles in Sweden

References

External links
Gyllenstiernska Krapperupsstiftelsen website

Other sources

Ranby, Caroline (2003)  Krapperup mellan renässans och skiftesreformer (Nyhamnsläge: Gyllenstiernska Krapperupstiftelsen) 
Ullgren Peter  (2007)  Ur Krapperups historia   (Nyhamnsläge: Gyllenstiernska Krapperupstiftelsen) 

Buildings and structures in Skåne County
Buildings and structures completed in 1570
1570 establishments in Sweden